"Lilin-Lilin Kecil" (English: "Little Candles") is an Indonesian pop song written by James F. Sundah for the Prambors 1977 Teenage Song-Writing Competition and performed by Chrisye. To date it has been covered over fifty times. Rolling Stone Indonesia listed it as the thirteenth best Indonesian song of all time.

Writing
James F. Sundah wrote "Lilin-Lilin Kecil" for the Prambors Teenage Song-Writing Competition of 1977. The initial song was written in D and F.

Chrisye was chosen to be the singer for his smooth vocals. The song was arranged by Jockie Soerjoprajogo.

Themes
According to Sundah, "Lilin-Lilin Kecil" is about his friends who had difficulties in life when older generations had successful careers. It has also been described as a memorial song.

Reception
"Lilin-Lilin Kecil" placed fifth in the competition and was the most popular of the finalists on the Lomba Cipta Lagu Remaja album.

"Lilin-Lilin Kecil" launched Chrisye's career and has been called his signature song. He considered its success to be due to its immersing melody and romantic lyrics with his smooth vocals.

"Lilin-Lilin Kecil" has been covered by over fifty singers and bands, including Blue Diamonds, Victor Wood, and Arie Kosmiran. Instrumental versions were released by Alex Faraknimella and Yockie Soerjoprajogo.

Rolling Stone Indonesia listed "Lilin-Lilin Kecil" as the thirteenth best Indonesian song of all time.

"Lilin-Lilin Kecil" has been used as a memorial song, such as at the sixth anniversary of the 2002 Bali bombing.

References

1977 songs
Indonesian songs